Shri Sahebju Purendra Bikram Shah Subikhyat-Tri-Shakti-Patta, Suprasidha-Prabala-Gorkha-Dakshina-Bahu, GCMG (20 January 1900 – 1 May 1976) was a senior member of the Nepalese Royal clan. He was member of the Royal Advisory Council formed by King Mahendra of Nepal in 1955 as an independent member nominated by the King, a close relative. He also held other key portfolios as Minister including Defence (1956-1958) and Foreign (1958-1959) of Nepal.

Life

Sahebju Purendra's alma mater was the University of Allahabad. After the downfall of the Rana regime in 1951, he became heavily involved in affairs of state as a close ally of King Mahendra of Nepal. In 1955, he was nominated as member of the King's 5 man Advisory Council as an independent candidate. He then went onto serving as Foreign and Defence Minister of Nepal during key turning points of history including the admission of Nepal into the United Nations in 1955 as well as the State Visits carried out by King Mahendra of Nepal to China, United Kingdom, United States, Soviet Union etc. Sahebju Purendra played a key role in the changing dynamics of Nepal's foreign policy in bringing her out of isolation As Minister for Foreign Affairs, he led several high level delegations on Official Visits to China, United States, United Nations, India, United Kingdom, France, Belgrade Serbia amongst others.

He became member of the Rajya Sabha, Upper House of Parliament in 1962.

Honours 

National honours
 Member of the Order of Three Divine Powers, 1st class.
 Member of the Order of the Gurkha Right Hand, 1st class.
 King Tribhuvan Coronation Medal (20 February 1913). 
 King Tribhuvan Silver Jubilee Medal (1935).
 King Mahendra Coronation Medal (2 May 1956).
 King Birendra Coronation Medal (25 February 1975).

Foreign honours
 Knight Grand Cross of The Most Distinguished Order of St Michael and St George [GCMG] (1961).

References

1900 births
1976 deaths
People from Kathmandu
Shah dynasty
Nepalese Hindus
Foreign Ministers of Nepal